Sangli may refer to:
 Sangli-ye Shirin
 Sangli-ye Shur